{{Infobox U.S. legislation
| shorttitle = Authorization for Use of Military Force
| othershorttitles = 
| longtitle = Joint Resolution to authorize the use of United States Armed Forces against those responsible for the recent attacks launched against the United States
| colloquialacronym = AUMF
| nickname = 
| enacted by = 107th
| effective date = September 18, 2001
| public law url = 
| cite public law = 
| cite statutes at large = 
| acts amended = 
| acts repealed = 
| title amended = 
| sections created = 
| sections amended = 
| leghisturl = https://www.congress.gov/bill/107th-congress/senate-joint-resolution/23/all-actions
| introducedin = Senate
| introducedbill = S.J.Res.23
| introducedby = Tom Daschle (D–SD)
| introduceddate = Sept. 14, 2001
| committees = 
| passedbody1 = Senate
| passeddate1 = Sept. 14, 2001
| passedvote1 = 98-0
| passedbody2 = House
| passedas2 = H.J.Res.64
| passeddate2 = Sept. 14, 2001
| passedvote2 = 420-1
| signedpresident = George W. Bush
| signeddate = Sept. 18, 2001
| amendments = 
| SCOTUS cases = Hamdan v. Rumsfeld (2006), ACLU v. NSA (2007), Hedges v. Obama (2012)
| unsignedpresident = 
| vetoedpresident = 
}}
The Authorization for Use of Military Force (AUMF) is a joint resolution of the United States Congress which became law on September 18, 2001, authorizing the use of the United States Armed Forces against those responsible for the September 11 attacks. The authorization granted the President the authority to use all "necessary and appropriate force" against those whom he determined "planned, authorized, committed or aided" the September 11 attacks, or who harbored said persons or groups.
The AUMF was passed by the 107th Congress on September 18, 2001, and signed into law by President George W. Bush on September 18, 2001. Since 2001, U.S. Presidents have interpreted their authority under the AUMF to extend beyond al Qaeda and the Taliban in Afghanistan to apply to numerous other groups as well as other geographic locales.  In December 2016, the Office of the President published a brief interpreting the AUMF as providing Congressional authorization for the use of force against al-Qaeda and other militant groups.  Today, the full list of actors the U.S. military is fighting or believes itself authorized to fight under the 2001 AUMF is classified and therefore a secret unknown to the American public.

The only representative to vote against the Authorization in 2001 was Barbara Lee, who has consistently criticized it since for being a blank check giving the government unlimited powers to wage war without debate. Business Insider has reported that the AUMF has been used to allow military deployment in Afghanistan, the Philippines, Georgia, Yemen, Djibouti, Kenya, Ethiopia, Eritrea, Iraq, and Somalia.

Text of the AUMF

Congressional votes
An initial draft of Senate Joint Resolution 23  included language granting the power "to deter and preempt any future acts of terrorism or aggression against the United States." Members were concerned that this would provide "a blank check to go anywhere, anytime, against anyone the Bush administration or any subsequent administration deemed capable of carrying out an attack" and the language was removed.

Senate
On September 14, 2001, Senate Joint Resolution 23 passed in the Senate by roll call vote. The totals in the Senate were: 98 Ayes, 0 Nays, 2 Present/Not Voting (Senators Larry Craig, R-ID, and Jesse Helms, R-NC).

House of Representatives
On September 14, 2001, the House passed House Joint Resolution 64 . The totals in the House of Representatives were 420 ayes, 1 nay and 10 not voting. The sole nay vote was by Barbara Lee, D-CA. Lee was the only member of either house of Congress to vote against the bill. Lee opposed the wording of the AUMF, not the action it represented. She believed that a response was necessary but feared the vagueness of the document was similar to the 1964 Gulf of Tonkin Resolution. Lee has initiated several attempts to repeal the authorization.

History
Bush administration
The AUMF was unsuccessfully cited by the George W. Bush administration in Hamdan v. Rumsfeld (2006), in which the U.S. Supreme Court ruled that the administration's military commissions at Guantanamo Bay were not competent tribunals as constituted and thus illegal. The Court held that President George W. Bush did not have the authority to set up the war crimes tribunals and finding the special military commissions illegal under both military justice law and the Geneva Conventions.

In 2007, the AUMF was cited by the Department of Justice in ACLU v. NSA as authority for engaging in electronic surveillance without obtaining a warrant of the special court as required by the Constitution.

Obama administration
In 2012, journalists and activists brought a suit (Hedges v. Obama) against the National Defense Authorization Act for Fiscal Year 2012, in which Congress "affirms" presidential authority for indefinite detention under the AUMF and makes specific provisions as to the exercise of that authority.

In 2016, constitutional law specialist professor Bruce Ackerman of Yale Law School said that the Obama Administration's use of the AUMF to that point had overstepped the authorized powers of the final, enacted version of the bill so as to more closely resemble the capabilities named in this draft text rejected by Congress.

Trump administration
On June 29, 2017, a group of libertarian Republicans and Democrats on the House Appropriations Committee approved Barbara Lee's amendment to end the 2001 authorization within 240 days. This would have forced debate on a replacement authorization, but the amendment was removed from the bill by the Rules Committee, and the AUMF remains in effect.

In 2018, Senators Tim Kaine and Bob Corker proposed several updates to the AUMF.

In November 2019, the AUMF was supposed to be grounds for the occupation of Kurdish-controlled Syrian oilfields, as the Trump administration sought legal authorization to maintain a presence in the area.

Use by the U.S. Government
The AUMF has also been cited by a wide variety of US officials as justification for continuing US military actions all over the world. Often the phrase "Al-Qaeda and associated forces" has been used by these officials. However, that phrase does not appear in the AUMF, but is instead an interpretation of the 2001 AUMF by U.S. Presidents Bush, Obama, and Trump.  The U.S. government has formally used the term in litigation, including a March 2009 Department of Justice brief as well as the 2012 National Defense Authorization Act.

According to a report by the Congressional Research Service, published May 11, 2016, at that time the 2001 AUMF had been cited 37 times in connection with actions in 14 countries and on the high seas. The report stated that "Of the 37 occurrences, 18 were made during the Bush Administration, and 19 have been made during the Obama Administration." The countries that were mentioned in the report included Afghanistan, Cuba (Guantanamo Bay), Djibouti, Eritrea, Ethiopia, Georgia, Iraq, Kenya, Libya, the Philippines, Somalia, Syria and Yemen.

An updated Congressional Research Service report, published February 16, 2018, documented 2 additional citations of the AUMF by the Obama Administration and 2 citations of the AUMF by the Trump Administration.

See also
 The Authorization for Use of Military Force Against Iraq Resolution of 2002
 Hedges v. Obama''
 National Defense Authorization Act for Fiscal Year 2012
 Targeted killing
 The US Patriot Act (2001) and Title II of the Patriot Act, entitled Enhanced Surveillance Procedures
 Operation Enduring Freedom
 War Powers Clause, United States Constitution Art. 1, Sect. 8, Clause 11, which vests in the Congress the exclusive power to declare war.

References

External links

 Authorization for Use of Military Force as amended (PDF/details) in the GPO Statute Compilations collection
 S.J. Res. 23
 Full text of the law (FindLaw)
 White House - President Signs Authorization for Use of Military Force bill

Acts of the 107th United States Congress
2001 in military history
Causes and prelude of the Iraq War
War in Afghanistan (2001–2021)
United States foreign relations legislation
Telecommunications law
2001 in international relations
Terrorism laws in the United States
American involvement in the Syrian civil war